The Monson Developmental Center was a Massachusetts state facility in Monson, Massachusetts.  The property, whose core has been in state control since 1854, historically housed a variety of facilities for providing services to the indigent or sick.  It was closed in 2012, and the state is (as of 2017) soliciting bids for sale and reuse of the developed portions of the property.

History
In 1854 the Commonwealth of Massachusetts acquired  of land in northern Monson, on which it erected an almshouse to provide facilities for poor immigrants fleeing the Great Famine of Ireland. In 1855, it was renamed the State Farm School, and later the State Primary School, and it housed children who were wards of the state. It served in this role until 1887. In 1898 the state's Hospital for Epileptics opened on the grounds, using the old facilities and adding several more buildings.

The property was listed on the National Register of Historic Places in 1994. Since then, its population has continued to decline, and the state in 2008 announced plans to close the facility. In 2012 the state relocated the last 31 residents, and began to consider the future of the property. After the facility was closed, the state planned to demolish nearly half the buildings, citing either their deteriorated condition or the presence of asbestos.

See also
Belchertown State School, a similar state-owned facility
National Register of Historic Places listings in Hampden County, Massachusetts

References

Hospitals in Hampden County, Massachusetts
Historic districts in Hampden County, Massachusetts
Defunct hospitals in Massachusetts
National Register of Historic Places in Hampden County, Massachusetts
Historic districts on the National Register of Historic Places in Massachusetts
Monson, Massachusetts
1854 establishments in Massachusetts
2012 disestablishments in Massachusetts